Dolosicoccus is a Gram-positive, facultatively anaerobic and non-motile genus of bacteria from the family of Aerococcaceae with one known species (Dolosicoccus paucivorans).

References

Lactobacillales
Bacteria genera
Monotypic bacteria genera